XEN-AM (branded as Radio Centro/El Fonógrafo) is a commercial radio station in Mexico City.  It airs a talk radio and Spanish oldies radio format on 690 kHz. The station is owned by Grupo Radio Centro.

XEN broadcasts with 100,000 watts by day.  But to avoid interfering with other stations on AM 690, it reduces power at night to 5,000 watts.  The transmitter is in the San Miguel Teotongo neighborhood in Mexico City. XEN-AM can be heard in HD on XHFAJ-FM HD2.

690 AM is a Mexican and Canadian clear-channel frequency; CKGM and XEWW share Class A status of this frequency.

History

Early Years
XEN-AM started as CYS, on 710 kHz. The station was owned by General Electric Mexico from 1925 to 1930.

For most of 1930, from February 5 to the end of the year, the station, by then known as "Radio Mundial XEN" and bearing its current call sign, offered something never before provided on radio: a constant all news radio service. Radio Noticias was owned by Félix F. Palavicini, a journalist who acquired the station at the start of the year.

The earliest concession for XEN-AM was awarded to Cervecería Modelo, S.A., in 1934. At that time the station still broadcast on 710 kHz. The next year, the station was transferred to Guillermina Pontones de del Conde, and later it moved to its current dial position on 690 kHz.

World Music, Sports and Lounge Music
Beginning in the 1950s and until the early 1990s, it carried a world music format as Radio Mundo. In 1993, the station switched to a sports radio format as Radio Sportiva.

By the late 1990s it offered lounge music and newscasts under the name Ondas del Lago.

La 69
In 2001, Grupo Radio Centro bought the indebted station, disaffiliated it from the Cadena RASA system and converted it to a news format, known as La 69 - Es Noticia. The purchase was made possible because the previous year Radio Centro had sold 1320 AM and 1560 AM to Infored. However, the station generally lacked unique programming.  It mainly aired a simulcast of the two-hour midday newscast of Radio Red, which was hosted by Jacobo Zabludovsky until his death on July 2, 2015, being substituted by Juan Francisco Castañeda.  The newscast originated on XEN, before moving to Radio Red in 2004.

The newscast was recorded and repeated throughout the day and on weekends. A program with José Alberto Barranco Chavarría called "Entre líneas" that beginning July 4, 2016, was also simulcast on Radio Red. Another program, a seven-hour morning talk show, "¿Y usted, qué opina?" hosted by Nino Canún, was cancelled in August 2014. The station's only original programming after 2016 were cultural capsules aired during commercial breaks, having no advertisers outside of government and electoral spots.

Radio Centro and El Fonógrafo
In 2017, citing "changes in AM transmission infrastructure," Grupo Radio Centro reorganized all of its AM radio stations.  It shut down several stations and consolidating their programs. La 69 was replaced by content from the former XEQR-AM 1030, talk-formatted Radio Centro, and XEJP-AM 1150, El Fonógrafo.

Radio Centro's sole program to transition to XEN, "Buenos Días con Héctor Martínez Serrano" airs from 5:30 to 10:00am on weekdays and 5:30 to 11:00am on weekends, with El Fonógrafo oldies music filling in the rest of the air time (except for Sundays at noon, when Catholic mass airs). Since July 2019, the station is also used to broadcast soccer matches from Liga MX on Friday nights, as well as UEFA Champions League matches on some weekdays. Besides airing on XEN, El Fonógrafo also maintains a separate stream solely dedicated to music without announcers or commercial interruptions, which could also be heard on the HD2 subchannel of XEJP-FM until 2020. Martínez Serrano died on May 9, 2020, with his collaborators taking over the hosting of "Buenos Días".

Beginning on May 18, 2020, XEN began to be simulcasted on XEQR-AM, ending on June 18, 2022.

References

External links

Radio stations in Mexico City
Radio stations established in 1925
1925 establishments in Mexico
Grupo Radio Centro